Margie Wright Diamond is a college softball stadium located on the campus of California State University, Fresno.  It is the home field of the Fresno State Bulldogs softball team.  The venue is named for legendary Bulldogs coach Margie Wright, who led Fresno State to 1,294 wins, eight Women's College World Series appearances and the 1998 Women's College World Series championship.  She retired as college softball's all-time wins leader.

References

College softball venues in the United States
Fresno State Bulldogs softball
Softball venues in California
Sports venues in Fresno, California
1996 establishments in California
Sports venues completed in 1996